Fires of Life is the first studio album by American melodic death metal band Starkill. It was released on 13 May 2013 in North America and Europe on 16 May 2013 on CD and digital download. A music video for "Fires of Life" was released on 8 February 2013; followed by another video for "New Infernal Rebirth" on 28 March 2013, and a music video for "Sword, Spear, Blood, Fire", which was released on 11 April 2014.

Track listing

Personnel
 Parker Jameson – vocals, guitar, keyboards, orchestral programming
 Charlie Federici – guitar
 Mike Buetsch – bass guitar
 Spencer Weidner – drums

References

External links
 Starkill – Fires Of Life – CMDistro.de
 STARKILL – Fires of Life (OFFICIAL VIDEO) – YouTube
 STARKILL – New Infernal Rebirth (OFFICIAL VIDEO) – YouTube
 STARKILL – Sword, Spear, Blood, Fire (OFFICIAL VIDEO) – YouTube

2013 debut albums
Starkill albums
Century Media Records albums